Robert "Bicycle Bob" Silverman (30 November 1933 – 20 February 2022) was a Canadian cycling activist in Montreal.

Biography
Silverman grew up in the Snowdon neighborhood of Montreal and attended the High School of Montreal and Sir George Williams University. At the age of 25, with the financial help of his father, he opened a bookstore on Stanley Street. A Trotskyist, he had no incentive for profit and often gave books away to customers, driving him into bankruptcy.

While studying in France in 1969, Silverman discovered great enjoyment from cycling. Encouraged by his wife, Edith, he rode his bicycle to his French lessons. Upon his return to Montreal in 1970, he purchased a second-hand bicycle during an era in which cycling in the city was rare. In 1975, he co-founded the group  to fight for better bicycle safety in Montreal. In 1977, he attempted to organize an international cycling foundation, saying "Cyclists of all countries, unite. You have nothing to lose but your chains! Let's build International Cycling". He proposed the creation of a multilingual library and an international liaison bulletin.

Silverman died in Sainte-Agathe-des-Monts on 20 February 2022, at the age of 88.

References

1933 births
2022 deaths
Canadian activists
Canadian Trotskyists
Canadian communists
Anglophone Quebec people
Activists from Quebec
High School of Montreal alumni
People from Montreal